The 2016–17 Adelaide United W-League season was the club's ninth season in the W-League, the premier competition for women's football in Australia.

Players

Squad information 
Adelaide United's women squad for the 2016–17 W-League, updated 23 November 2017

Transfers in

Transfers out

Contract extensions

Managerial staff

Statistics

Squad statistics

Competitions

W-League

League table

Results summary

Results by round

Matches

References

External links
 Official Website

Adelaide United FC (A-League Women) seasons
Adelaide United